Becky Currie (born May 2, 1957) is an American politician. She is a member of the Mississippi House of Representatives from the 81st District, being first elected in 2007. She is a member of the Republican party. She currently serves as the Chairman of Tourism in the Mississippi House and is serving her first term as the first female president of the Mississippi House Conservative Coalition.

Legislation
In 2018, Representative Currie sponsored the Mississippi Gestational Age Act (HB 1510), prohibiting abortions after 15 weeks gestation. The bill, signed into law by Mississippi Governor Phil Bryant (R) on March 19, 2018, allows abortion only in cases of medical emergency or severe fetal abnormality, with no allowance made for rape.

In 2020, Currie voted yes on the bill to change the Mississippi State Flag.

References

1957 births
Living people
Republican Party members of the Mississippi House of Representatives
21st-century American politicians